Chapali Bhadrakali is a village and former Village Development Committee that is now part of Budanilkantha Municipality in Kathmandu District in Province No. 3 of central Nepal. At the time of the 2011 Nepal census it had a population of 10,827 and had 2,574 households in it.

References

Populated places in Kathmandu District